Alberto Cruz Montt (1879 – 1955), was a Chilean architect and professor who was an exponent of the Neoclassical style.

Early life 
Alberto Cruz Montt was son of Ramón Cruz Moreno and Eloísa Montt Montt. He was educated at the École Spéciale d'Architecture in Paris.

Marriage 
He married Beatriz Larraín Bravo, the sister of the also architect Ricardo Larraín Bravo, who was his partner in various architectural works, like the Palacio Íñiguez, currently housing the Confitería Torres.

He was professor of History of Architecture at the Universidad de Chile and at the Pontificia Universidad Católica de Chile, between 1952 and 1955.

Works

Gallery

References 

Academic staff of the Pontifical Catholic University of Chile
Academic staff of the University of Chile
Chilean architects
Montt family
1879 births
1955 deaths